Leikanger Church is a parish church of the Church of Norway in Sogndal Municipality in Vestland county, Norway. It is located in the village of Leikanger, along the northern coast of the Sognefjorden. It is the church for the Leikanger parish which is part of the Sogn prosti (deanery) in the Diocese of Bjørgvin. The white, stone church has a large wooden steeple. The building was constructed in a long church design around the year 1250 using plans drawn up by an unknown architect. The church seats about 220 people.

History
The earliest existing historical records of the church date back to the year 1308, but the church was not new that year. The stone church was probably first built during the 12th century. The west portal in the church has been dated to the late-1100s. Around the year 1200, the choir was rebuilt and enlarged. (Some sources say that this rebuilding of the choir may have been a whole new church built after removing the old church.) Parts of the building have been renovated and rebuilt over the centuries. In the 1660s, the church was renovated. The chancel was reconstructed and the old tower was torn down and rebuilt in a neo-gothic style. At the same time, the walls were repaired and an attic area was created.

In 1814, this church served as an election church. Together with more than 300 other parish churches across Norway, it was a polling station for elections to the 1814 Norwegian Constituent Assembly which wrote the Constitution of Norway. This was Norway's first national elections. Each church parish was a constituency that elected people called "electors" who later met together in each county to elect the representatives for the assembly that was to meet in Eidsvoll later that year.

In 1872, the church was heavily renovated by the architect Christian Christie. During this reconstruction, the entire choir was torn down, the nave was lengthened to the east, and then a new choir was built. Also, a new wooden church porch and tower was built on the west end. The redesigned church was consecrated on 14 November 1872 by Bishop Peter Hersleb Graah Birkeland after the extensive reconstruction. In the 1930s through the 1950s, the church was again renovated, this time under the direction of the architect Johan Lindstrøm. This included a completely rebuilt wooden tower, and a focus on bringing back the historic look of the building.

Priests 
There have been many priests to serve this church since the Reformation:

 Jon Røg, 1537–1552
 Magister Erik Loss, 1550–1565
 Jens Engelsøn, 1565–1607
 Magister Hans Kruse, 1607–1617
 Hans Nilsen Arctander, 1617–1618
 Erik Iversen Nordal, 1618–1658
 Jens Bugge, 1658–1684
 Magister Samuel Bugge, 1685–1718
 Iver Iversen Leganger 1719–1750
 Gerhard Geelmuyden, 1750–1764
 Ole Bernhoft Friis, 1764–1782
 Nils Frantzsøn Wolff, 1783–1789
 Anders Daae, 1789–1819
 Nils Norman, 1816–1822
 Peter Johan Norman, 1823–1839
 Søren Wilhelm Thorne, 1840–1849
 Johan David Haslund, 1849–1869
 Iver Olaus Widerøe, 1870–1878
 Jakob Liv Rosted Sverdrup, 1878–1884
 Jakob Walnum, 1884–1896
 Fredrik Vilhelm Bull-Hansen, 1897–1923
 Sverre Daae, 1923–1945
 Nils Ruset, 1945–1950
 Sverre Daae, 1950–1960
 Einar Bjorvand, 1960–1965
 Oddmund Hjermann, 1965–1975
 Bjarne Imenes, 1975–1985
 Einar Hansen, 1986–1988
 Tore Wigen, 1989–1990
 Kjell Sæter, 1991–2007
 Egon Askvik, 2008–

Media gallery

See also
List of churches in Bjørgvin

References

Sogndal
Churches in Vestland
Long churches in Norway
Stone churches in Norway
12th-century churches in Norway
12th-century establishments in Norway
Norwegian election church